William Hogg Brownlie (1882 – 30 April 1943) was a Scottish footballer who played as a left back.

His senior career in Scotland was spent solely with hometown club Hamilton Academical where he spent six full seasons and the first part of a seventh before emigrating to Canada. He won the minor Lanarkshire Cup on three occasions, but had left before any matches were played in the 1910–11 Scottish Cup in which the Accies reached the final.

Brownlie had some success playing in North America, winning the provincial Ontario Cup in 1918 and the United District Football League in 1919 with Toronto Scottish (where he was noted for his defensive partnership with Geordie Campbell) before being signed by American side Brooklyn Robins Dry Dock. There he won the American Cup in 1920 with a surprise win over the dominant team of the time, Bethlehem Steel, then the National Challenge Cup (later known as the U.S. Open Cup) in 1921, beating St. Louis Scullin Steel. By now a veteran in his late 30s, Brownlie then returned to Canada and Toronto Scottish, adding a Robertson Cup to his collection in 1922 (he was not involved in their further Ontario Cup finals of that period).

References

1882 births
1943 deaths
Scottish emigrants to Canada
Footballers from Hamilton, South Lanarkshire
Scottish footballers
Strathclyde F.C. players
Hamilton Academical F.C. players
Scottish Football League players
Association football defenders
Toronto Scottish players
Scottish Junior Football Association players
National Association Football League players
Robins Dry Dock players
Scottish expatriate sportspeople in the United States
Expatriate soccer players in the United States
Scottish expatriate footballers